Gabriel Alonso Suazo Urbina (born 9 August 1997) is a Chilean professional footballer who plays as a left-back for  club Toulouse.

Club career
After spent nine seasons with Colo-Colo, he moved to France and joined Toulouse in January 2023.

International career
Along with Chile U20, he won the L'Alcúdia Tournament in 2015.

Suazo represented Chile U20 at the 2017 South American Championship and Chile U23 at both the 2019 Toulon Tournament and the 2020 Pre-Olympic Tournament.

Suazo was called up for Chile's pre-Copa América Centenario friendly against Mexico in May 2016.

Honors
Colo-Colo
Chilean Primera División (3): 2015–A, Transición 2017, 2022 
Copa Chile: 2016, 2019, 2021
Supercopa de Chile (3): 2017, 2018, 2022

Chile U20
 L'Alcúdia International Tournament (1): 2015

Individual
Chilean Primera División Team of the Season: 2022

References

External links
 
 Colo Colo Player Profile

1997 births
Living people
Footballers from Santiago
Chilean footballers
Chile international footballers
Chile under-20 international footballers
Association football midfielders
Colo-Colo B footballers
Colo-Colo footballers
Toulouse FC players
Segunda División Profesional de Chile players
Chilean Primera División players
Ligue 1 players
Expatriate footballers in France
Chilean expatriate sportspeople in France